Helping John is a 1912 short American silent comedy written Bannister Merwin, directed by Harold M. Shaw, and produced by the Edison Company at its main studio in New York City, in the Bronx.

Production
Although some modern film references credit Bannister Merwin with directing Helping John, it was actually Harold M. Shaw who served as the motion picture's director. In 1912, in its semimonthly newsletter The Kinetogram, the Edison Company in the August 15 issue recognizes Merwin as the screenwriter of the project with the commonly used "By" credit for story writers; however, in the newsletter's next issue, on September 1, Edison announces Shaw's recent promotion to director at the studio and publicly credits and compliments him for directing Helping John along with other films produced in the summer of 1912:

Release and distribution
The film was released in the United States on August 28, 1912.<ref>"Calendar of Licensed Releases", '’The Moving Picture World (New York, New York), 31 August 1912, volume 13, number 9,  p. 892. Internet Archive (I.A.), San Francisco, California. Retrieved 16 August 2021.</ref> By December that year, it reached venues in New Zealand, with screenings in Canterbury at the beginning of the month and in Whanganui, where the local newspaper on December 26 promoted Helping John as "A Comedy Drama, written by Bannister Mervin ".Amusements Wanganui Herald. Volume XLVII. Issue 13864. 26 December 1912. p 1. Retrieved 25 December 2015 It played in Masterton the next month and at His Majesty's Theatre in Stratford, Taranaki in February 1913.Stratford News Taranaki Daily News. Volume LV. Issue 238. 27 February 1913. p 3. Retrieved 25 December 2015 Then, in March, it was presented on a twin bill with another comedy, Holding the Fort'', at King's Theatre in Thames.

References

External links
 

1912 films
1912 comedy films
1912 short films
Silent American comedy films
American black-and-white films
American silent short films
American comedy short films
1910s American films
1910s English-language films